Suspension is a construction passing from a map to a flow. Namely, let  be a metric space,  be a continuous map and  be a function (roof function or ceiling function) bounded away from 0. Consider the quotient space:

References

Dynamical systems